George Bazeley (born 19 January 1984, in Echuca, Victoria) is an Australian field hockey player. He plays the position of goalkeeper. Bazeley is a member of The Kookaburras, the Australia men's national field hockey team. He represents the Victorian Vikings in the Australian Hockey League domestic competition and Uttar Pradesh Wizards in the Hockey India League. He made his international debut in the Australian national team in January 2009 against the Netherlands. He won a gold medal at the 2010 FIH World Cup in Delhi, India. He won 3 consecutive gold medals at the 2009, 2010 and 2011 FIH Hockey Champions Trophy tournaments. He is a member of 2012 Summer Olympics Australian men's national squad and is trying to secure a spot on the team so he can represent Australia at the 2012 Summer Olympics.

Personal
Bazeley was born on 19 January 1984 in Echuca, Victoria. He graduated from University High School, Melbourne in 2001. Bazeley resides in Perth, Australia in order to spend more time with the national team. One of his hobbies is playing golf.

Field Hockey
Bazeley is a goalkeeper. He started playing the sport when he was five years old in Echuca, Victoria. He played junior hockey for the Essendon Hockey Club in Melbourne.  In 2009, he was recovering from a knee injury that required surgery.

Teams
Bazeley plays club hockey for the Hawthorn Hockey Club in Melbourne and the Victoria Park Hockey Club in Perth. He was in goal for the team in a May 2011 match in the Victorian State League 1 competition game against Altona when his side lost 2–1.
In 2010/11 he played professional hockey in the Dutch hoofdklasse competition for TMHC Tilburg.

National Team
Bazeley gained the attention of the national team after a coaching change that brought Ric Charlesworth in.
He made his debut for The Kookaburras in January 2009. He earned a gold medal at the Men's Hockey Champions Trophy. Prior to the 2010 Commonwealth Games, the coach Ric Charlesworth made getting selection an active competition between Bazeley, Nathan Burgers and Ross Meadows. In May 2011, he was with the team in Perth where they were training. In May 2011, he played in the Azlan Shah Cup for Australia.  The Cup featured teams from Pakistan, Malaysia, India, South Korea, Britain and New Zealand. In December 2011, he was named as one of twenty-eight players to be on the 2012 Summer Olympics Australian men's national training squad. This squad will be narrowed in June 2012.  He trained with the team from 18 January to mid-March in Perth, Western Australia. In February during the training camp, he played in a four nations test series with the teams being the Kookaburras, Australia A Squad, the Netherlands and Argentina.

References

External links
 
 
 

1984 births
Australian male field hockey players
Field hockey players from Melbourne
Field hockey players from Perth, Western Australia
Living people
Hockey India League players
Uttar Pradesh Wizards players
2010 Men's Hockey World Cup players